The Samsung Galaxy Pocket Neo is an Android smartphone manufactured by Samsung. It was announced in March 2013 and released in May 2013 as the successor to the Samsung Galaxy Pocket Plus. The handset is still budget-oriented, sporting a larger 3-inch display. Its specifications are similar to that of the Samsung Galaxy Pocket Plus, with only minor upgrades such as the Android 4.1.2 Jelly Bean operating system and the display size. The Samsung Galaxy Pocket Neo, like its predecessors, is still marketed as "Pocket Friendly," because it can be slipped inside pockets easily despite the larger size.

Specifications

Design 
The Samsung Galaxy Pocket Neo is made of plastic. It has a 3.0 inch display; there is a "Samsung" logo, an earpiece and sensors at the upper bezel of the display while there is a physical home button and two capacitive buttons (menu and back buttons) at the lower bezel of the display. On the side frame; there is a volume rocker at the left, there is a power button at the right, there is a microUSB port and a microphone hole at the bottom, and there is a 3.5 mm headphone jack at the top. There is a rear-facing camera and a speaker at the back; the phone doesn't have an LED flash. The back cover is removable; removing the back cover reveals a removable battery, a microSD card slot and a SIM card slot.

It measures 105 x 57.8 x 11.8 mm and weighs 100 grams. It is available in white and gray.

Hardware 
The Samsung Galaxy Pocket Neo is powered by Broadcom BCM21654/G system-on-chip with an 850 MHz single core ARM Cortex-A9 CPU. It comes with 512 MB of RAM and 4 GB of internal storage which can be further expanded to up to 32 GB using a microSD card. It has a 3-inch TFT LCD display with QVGA (240x320 pixels) resolution and 133 ppi pixel density. It has a 1200 mAh Li-ion removable battery. Connectivity options include 3G, Wi-Fi 802.11 b/g/n, Bluetooth 4.0, GPS and GLONASS. It also features a 2 MP rear camera and is capable of video recording at 320x240 pixels resolution at 15 fps.

Software 
The phone runs on Android 4.1.2 Jelly Bean with Samsung's user interface TouchWiz Nature UX. It also includes the Social Hub app that combines every account registered on the phone to be unified in a single app.

See also
List of Android devices
Samsung Galaxy Young
Samsung Galaxy Fame
Samsung Galaxy Star
Samsung Galaxy Pocket Plus
Samsung Galaxy Pocket

References

External links 

Samsung Galaxy
Samsung smartphones
Android (operating system) devices
Mobile phones introduced in 2013